This is a list of African-American newspapers that have been published in Georgia.  It includes both current and historical newspapers.  The first such newspaper in Georgia was The Colored American, founded in Augusta in 1865. However, most were founded in Atlanta.

While most such newspapers in Georgia have been very short-lived, a few, such as the Savannah Tribune, Atlanta Daily World, and Atlanta Inquirer, have had extensive influence over many decades.

Newspapers that are currently published are highlighted in green in the list below.

Newspapers

See also 

List of African-American newspapers and media outlets
List of African-American newspapers in Alabama
List of African-American newspapers in Florida
List of African-American newspapers in North Carolina
List of African-American newspapers in South Carolina
List of African-American newspapers in Tennessee
List of newspapers in Georgia (U.S. state)

Works cited

References 

Newspapers
Georgia
African-American
African-American newspapers